Marcus Alexander "Marco" Janssen (born 1969 in Hendrik-Ido-Ambacht) is a Dutch American econometrician and Professor at the Arizona State University and Director of its Center for Behavior, Institutions, and the Environment. He is known for his work on the modelling of socio-ecological systems.

Life and work 
Janssen obtained his MA in Econometrics and Operations Research at the Erasmus University Rotterdam in 1992. He received his PhD in Mathematics at the Maastricht University in 1996 under supervision of J. Rotmans and O.J. Vrieze with the dissertation "Meeting targets: tools to support integrated assessment modelling of global change".

After his graduation Janssen started his academic career as Postdoctoral Research fellow at the Department of Spatial Economics of the Vrije Universiteit Amsterdam. In 2002 he moved to the United States, where he became Associate Research Scientist at the center for the study of Institutions, Population and Environmental Change of the Indiana University, and from 2002 to 2007 Research Scientist. In 2005 he moved to the Arizona State University where he started as assistant professor, and became Associate Professor in 2010, and Professor at the School of Sustainability of the Global Institute of Sustainability in 2015. In 2007 to 2010 he was also Associate Director of its Center for the Study of Institutional Diversity, and since 2010 director of its Center for the Study of Institutional Diversity, since 2015 School of Human Evolution and Social Change.

Janssen research interests are in the field of the "interaction of behavioral, institutional and ecological processes... how people, their institutional rules and the environment they live in fit together in the past, present and the future, from local scales to the global scale," and has developed "formal (computational) models of social and social-ecological systems, and perform controlled experiments in the lab and field, and study case study material to test the stylized models," and particularly on agent-based modeling and institutional analysis.

Selected publications 
 J.C.J.M. van den Bergh and M.A. Janssen (eds.) (2005). Economics of Industrial Ecology: Use of Materials, Structural Change and Spatial Scales. The MIT Press.
 Poteete, Amy R., Marco A. Janssen, and Elinor Ostrom. Working together: collective action, the commons, and multiple methods in practice. Princeton University Press, 2010.
 

Articles, a selection:
 Parker, D. C., Manson, S. M., Janssen, M. A., Hoffmann, M. J., & Deadman, P. (2003). "Multi-agent systems for the simulation of land-use and land-cover change: a review." Annals of the association of American Geographers, 93(2), 314–337.
 Anderies, John M., Marco A. Janssen, and Elinor Ostrom. "A framework to analyze the robustness of social-ecological systems from an institutional perspective." Ecology and society 9.1 (2004): 18.
 Young, O. R., Berkhout, F., Gallopin, G. C., Janssen, M. A., Ostrom, E., & van der Leeuw, S. (2006). "The globalization of socio-ecological systems: An agenda for scientific research." Global Environmental Change, 16(3), 304–316.
 Ostrom, Elinor, Marco A. Janssen, and John M. Anderies. "Going beyond panaceas." Proceedings of the National Academy of Sciences 104.39 (2007): 15176–15178.

References

External links 
 marcojanssen.info

1969 births
Living people
Dutch economists
Dutch mathematicians
Erasmus University Rotterdam alumni
Maastricht University alumni
Academic staff of Vrije Universiteit Amsterdam
Indiana University faculty
Arizona State University faculty
People from Hendrik-Ido-Ambacht